Koto may refer to:

 Koto (band), an Italian synth pop group
 Koto (instrument), a Japanese musical instrument
 Koto (kana), a ligature of two Japanese katakana
 Koto (traditional clothing), a traditional dress made by Afro-Surinamese women
 Koto, Konjic, a village in Bosnia and Herzegovina
 Koto, Tokyo, a ward of Tokyo
 KOTO (FM), a National Public Radio-affiliated radio station licensed to Telluride, Colorado
 Pterygota bequaertii, a timber species referred to by the trade name "Koto"
 The novel The Old Capital by Yasunari Kawabata, titled Koto in Japanese

Languages
 Orejón language (also known as Koto language)
 Coixoma language (also known as Koto language)
 Okpoto language (Nupoid) (also known as Koto language)
 Okpoto language (Upper Cross River) (also known as Koto language)

See also
 
 Kodo (disambiguation)
 Coto (disambiguation)
 Codo (disambiguation)